Lasko may refer to:

Places 
 Laško, a town in Slovenia
 Łasko, a village in West Pomeranian Voivodeship, Poland
 Łąsko, two villages in Kuyavian-Pomeranian Voivodeship, Poland
 Łąsko Małe
 Łąsko Wielkie

People 
 Lasko Andonovski (born 1991), Macedonian handball player
 Lech Łasko (born 1956), Polish volleyball player
 Léo Lasko (1885–1949), German screenwriter and film director
 Michał Łasko (born 1981), Italian volleyball player
 Miss Lasko-Gross (born 1977), American comics creator
 Peter Lasko (1924–2003), British art historian

Other uses 
 Laško subdialect of Slovenian
 Lasko – Die Faust Gottes, a German television series
 Laško Brewery, Slovenian brewing company

See also 
 Lakso
 Lasco
 Lazko